Wild Cherry is an unincorporated community in southwest Fulton County, Arkansas, United States. It is located along Arkansas Highway 223, just north of the Fulton-Izard county line. Wild Cherry Road runs north from the community. It is approximately six miles east of the eastern shore of Norfork Lake and about 11 miles north of Calico Rock. The elevation is 850 feet.

References

Unincorporated communities in Fulton County, Arkansas
Unincorporated communities in Arkansas